Cortlandt Street may refer to:

Streets
 Cortlandt Street (Manhattan), street in Lower Manhattan, most of which became part of the World Trade Center in the 1970s

Subway stations
 Cortlandt Street (BMT Broadway Line), a New York City Subway station served by the  trains
 WTC Cortlandt (IRT Broadway–Seventh Avenue Line) (formerly Cortlandt Street),  a New York City Subway station serving the  train
 Cortlandt Street (IRT Ninth Avenue Line), a station on the demolished IRT Ninth Avenue Line
 Cortlandt Street (IRT Sixth Avenue Line), a station on the demolished IRT Sixth Avenue Line

See also
 Cortlandt Alley, street in Lower Manhattan